WWOJ (99.1 FM) is a commercial radio station in Avon Park, Florida, broadcasting to the Sebring area. The stations is known as "OJ 99.1". The station's format is Country music, and the station consistently achieves the highest Arbitron ratings for the Sebring radio market.

WWOJ signed on in 1982 at 106.3 FM; the station's original format was adult standards/MOR. The current country format was adopted in 1985. WWOJ moved to its current 99.1 FM frequency with 10,000 watts of power in 1997.

References

External links
WWOJ official website
WWOJ-FM history at radioyears.com

WOJ
Country radio stations in the United States